Blu Cantrell (born Tiffany Cobb; March 16, 1976) is an American R&B and soul singer-songwriter.

Cantrell rose to fame in 2001, with the release of her debut single, "Hit 'Em Up Style (Oops!)", which peaked at number two on the US Billboard Hot 100 and topped the US Mainstream Top 40 chart. The song also charted in several other countries, and appeared on her debut album, So Blu. In 2002, the song earned Cantrell a Grammy Award nomination. In 2003, Cantrell released her second album, Bittersweet, which was nominated for a Grammy Award and included the single "Breathe" (featuring Sean Paul). Written and produced by Ivan Matias, "Breathe" was a major global success in 2003, especially in the United Kingdom, where it topped the UK Singles Chart for four consecutive weeks. "Breathe" also reached the top ten of several other charts across the world, including the European Hot 100.

Early life
Tiffany Cobb was born in Providence, Rhode Island. Her mother, former beauty queen Susi Franco, was an actress and jazz vocalist. She is of African-American, Narragansett and Cape Verdean descent on her father's side, and German, French, English, Scottish, and Irish (semi pan-British Isles) descent on her mother's. Cantrell's parents separated when she was a young child, she and her five siblings—Adam, Tino, Nick, Kelli, and Summer—were raised by her mother.

Career

Early career
In the late 1990s, Cantrell established herself as a professional backing vocalist for artists such as Sean "Puffy" Combs. In 1999, she became member of the girl group 8th Avenue, a protégé of singer Teddy Riley. The band recorded several songs and appeared on Blackstreet's 1999 album Finally, but their material was shelved after Riley left Blackstreet to reform his previous group Guy, and Blackstreet were dropped by Interscope Records. Shortly thereafter, 8th Avenue also disbanded. Before long, Cantrell was introduced by both a dancer friend and R&B singer Usher to music producer Tricky Stewart, the head of Red Zone Entertainment. Stewart originally wanted Cantrell to become a member of his girl group 321, but after a fruitful recording session, he offered to help develop Cantrell's solo career instead. Cantrell subsequently moved in with Stewart and his girlfriend in their house in Atlanta, and was promptly placed with Arista Records head Antonio "L.A." Reid, who offered the singer a contract with the company after hearing one song she wrote and sang in front of him and his staff. After a bidding war with several different labels, Reid's bid was the highest, prompting Cantrell to sign with them.

2001–2004: So Blu and Bittersweet
After her signing with Arista, Cantrell went straight into recording sessions with Dallas Austin and Stewart, as well as Jimmy Jam and Terry Lewis. In July 2001, her debut album, So Blu, was released. The record earned generally favorable reviews from critics and became a commercial success, particularly in North America, where it peaked at number eight on the US Billboard 200. It was eventually certified gold by both the Recording Industry Association of America (RIAA) and Music Canada. The album's lead single "Hit 'Em Up Style (Oops!)" became a top ten hit in Australia, Canada, New Zealand, and the Netherlands and peaked at number two on the US Billboard Hot 100. The song earned Cantrell Grammy Award nominations for Best Female R&B Vocal Performance and for Best R&B Song, as well as an American Music Award nomination for Favorite New Soul/R&B Artist, both in 2002. Also in 2002, Cantrell was featured in a small cameo role in Charles Stone III's musical comedy-drama film Drumline, where she could be seen singing the American national anthem. Her song "It's Killing Me (In My Mind)" was included on the soundtrack of the 2002 action comedy film Bad Company.

In 2003, Cantrell released her second album, Bittersweet which featured production from Kevin "She'kspere" Briggs, Mike City, Soulshock & Karlin, and Shep Crawford. As with her debut, the album garnered a positive reception from critics, even earning her a Best R&B Album nomination at the 46th Grammy Awards, but was less successful in the United States, peaking at number 37 on the Billboard 200. The album was a success internationally, where sales were boosted by its hit single "Breathe", a collaboration with Sean Paul. Her highest-charting single yet, it topped the charts in the United Kingdom and the Republic of Ireland, and reached the top ten of the majority of charts it appeared on, ranking among the biggest-selling releases of the year. "Breathe" was followed by the top thirty single "Make Me Wanna Scream".

2005–present

In 2005, following the formation of the joint venture of BMG and Sony Music Entertainment, Arista merged with J Records and began operating under the newly formed RCA Music Group. At about the same time, Cantrell's recording deal was up for renewal and though she was in a position to re-sign with the label, the singer chose to leave the company following the resignation of her mentor L.A. Reid. The following years, she toured intensively as a free agent. In 2007, Cantrell starred alongside LisaRaye and Kenya Moore in the musical stage play Gossip, Lies and Secrets which ran from September until November 2007. The following year, she appeared in NBC's Celebrity Circus. Cantrell became the first celebrity to be eliminated from the show in the season's second week.

In 2013, Cantrell confirmed that she was working independently on her third studio album. In December 2016, she told Fuse that she was still working on a new album.

Despite the lack of US success after her one big hit, Cantrell continues to perform in Australia and Europe.

Personal life
Cantrell was taken into custody by police for a psychological evaluation on September 3, 2014. She was seen running around the streets of Santa Monica at around 2 am, screaming that someone had "poisoned her with gas". Cantrell, according to witnesses, went "berserk" and referred to herself as a "one-hit wonder", questioning authorities whether they recognized her; when her "erratic" behavior failed to cease, someone called the police. She was taken to a nearby hospital, where she was evaluated by medics.

Discography

 So Blu (2001)
 Bittersweet (2003)

Awards and nominations

American Music Awards

Grammy Awards

References

External links

1978 births
20th-century African-American women singers
African-American women singer-songwriters
African-American songwriters
American contemporary R&B singers
American people of Italian descent
Living people
American neo soul singers
21st-century American singers
Musicians from Atlanta
American people of German descent
Musicians from Providence, Rhode Island
American musicians of Cape Verdean descent
Songwriters from Rhode Island
21st-century American women singers
21st-century African-American women singers
Singer-songwriters from Georgia (U.S. state)